The Lenawee was a Veteran era American automobile manufactured by the Church Manufacturing Company of Adrian, Lenawee County, Michigan in 1904.

History 
After Church's successful production of the Murray runabout in 1902 and 1903, they produced the Lenawee. The Lenawee was to be the technically advanced successor to the Murray, designed by Andrew Bachle who would become well known as the long-term engineer at Paige-Detroit.  The Lenawee was a left hand drive, five-seat tonneau body automobile, with a horizontal single-cylinder engine located beneath the front seat. They were priced at $1,000, .  Church discontinued Lenawee production after about 15 were built, and returned to the production of wire fences.  One Lenawee is extant.

References

 David Burgess Wise, The New Illustrated Encyclopedia of Automobiles.

Defunct motor vehicle manufacturers of the United States
Motor vehicle manufacturers based in Michigan
Defunct companies based in Michigan

Veteran vehicles
1900s cars
Cars introduced in 1904
Vehicle manufacturing companies established in 1902
Vehicle manufacturing companies disestablished in 1904